The 2020 Rice Owls football team represented Rice University in the 2020 NCAA Division I FBS football season. The Owls played their home games at Rice Stadium in Houston, Texas, and competed in the West Division of Conference USA (C–USA). They were led by third-year head coach Mike Bloomgren.

Previous season

The Owls finished the 2019 season 3–9, 3–5 in C-USA play to finish in a three-way tie for fourth place in the West Division.  They were not invited to any other postseason play.  Despite the losing record, the Owls retained Bloomgren, however, they did hired a new Offensive Line and Tight Ends coach.

Preseason

Award watch lists

Listed in the order that they were released

C-USA media poll
The preseason poll will be released prior to the Conference USA media days sometime during summer 2020 via a virtual conference due to the COVID-19 pandemic.

Preseason All–C-USA teams
The Preseason team will be released during the Virtual Media Day to be held in the summer of 2020.

Recruiting class
References:

|}

Personnel

Schedule

Rice had games scheduled against Lamar, Louisiana Tech, LSU, UTEP, and UTSA which were canceled due to the COVID-19 pandemic.

Schedule Source:

Game summaries

Middle Tennessee

at Southern Miss

at North Texas

at Marshall

UAB

References

Rice
Rice Owls football seasons
Rice Owls football